Philippe Comtois (born August 25, 1976) is a Canadian diver. He was born in Montreal, Quebec. He began diving at age 9 and stopped diving in 2005. He finished his studies in accountancy at the Université du Québec à Montréal in April 2008.

He won a gold medal at the Canada Cup in the 3-metre springboard synchro in 2003. Comtois, who trains at Club de Plongeon CAMO, at the Complexe sportif Claude-Robillard in Montreal, was Alexandre Despatie's synchronized diving partner at the 2004 Summer Olympics in Athens. They finished in 3rd place in the 10 metre diving, after having won two gold the previous year at the 2003 Pan American Games. Since he has stopped diving, he now coaches in Laval, Québec at the "Club de plongeon Laval".

References
 sports-reference

1976 births
Living people
Canadian male divers
Divers from Montreal
Olympic divers of Canada
Divers at the 1996 Summer Olympics
Divers at the 2004 Summer Olympics
Commonwealth Games competitors for Canada
Divers at the 1994 Commonwealth Games
Divers at the 1998 Commonwealth Games
Pan American Games gold medalists for Canada
Pan American Games medalists in diving
Divers at the 2003 Pan American Games
Universiade medalists in diving
Université du Québec à Montréal alumni
Universiade silver medalists for Canada
Medalists at the 1999 Summer Universiade
Medalists at the 2003 Pan American Games